Peralasseri is a census town and Panchayat headquarters in Kannur district in the Indian state of Kerala, situated on the Kannur-Kuthuparamba State Highway 38 (Kerala), 12 km from Kannur city, on the bank of Anjarakandy river.

Geography
In olden days the place was known as Peru+VaLa+Sery "Great Fertile Domicile, which fact can be confirmed by a visit to the place. The Place is surrounded by 4 panchayats: Kadambur, vengad, Anjarakandi, Pinarayi. The Panchayath Office is located near Peralassery Subrahmanya Temple.

Demographics 
As of 2011 Census, Peralasseri had a population of 16,821 which constitutes 7,687 (45.7%) males and 9,134 (54.3%) females. The male female sex ratio  was 1,188 higher than state average of 1,084. 
In Peralasseri, 10.3% of the population is under 6 years of age. Peralasseri had an overall literacy of 97.9% higher than state average of 94%. The male literacy stands at 98.8% and female literacy was 97%.

Religion
As of 2011 census, Peralasseri census town had total population of 16,821, which constitutes 79.4% Hindus, 20.4% Muslims and 0.2% others.

Highways and Bridges 
Kannur - Kuthuparamba state highway is passing through this place. Peralasseri is 15 km away from Kannur town and about 14 km away from the Kannur international airport near Mattanur.

The hanging bridge of Peralasseri is a notable tourist attraction. Built across the Anjarakandy river, this is one of the few hanging bridges in Kannur district.

Govt Offices
Peralassery Grama Panchayath Office
Mundaloor Post office
Makreri Village Office
KSEB Electrical Section Office - Peralassery
Kerala Water Authority Asst Engineer Office and Asst Executive Engineer Office.
BSNL Telephone Exchange - Peralassery

A.K.G. High School

Peralasseri A.K.G. Smaraka Govt. Higher Secondary School is an old school of Peralasseri town. The school is situated near the Peralasseri Temple at Mundalloor on the Kannur road. The school is known for good results and one of the good government school in Kerala

Medical Help
AKG Smaraka Co- op hospital
Govt. Ayurvedic Dispensary

Schools and Colleges
AKG Smaraka Govt.Higher secondary school

 Viswabharathi Public School, Mavilayi

Banks
Peralasseri Service Co-op Bank - Main Branch
Central Bank Of India - Peralasseri Branch
Mownachery Co-op Rural Bank - Peralasseri Branch
Canara Bank - Peralasseri Branch

Famous Religious Centres
Peralasseri Subrahmanya Temple
Sri Peralasseri Siva Temple :Kunhimooloth
Peralasseri Naroth Mahavishnu Temple
Rangoth Bhagavathy Temple
Makrery Subrahmanya-Hanuman Temple
Mahavishnu Sivakshetram Aivarkulam
Mundaloor Rifayi Masjid

Other Landmarks
AKG vaayanashala
Mundaloor Mueenul Islam Sabha Secondary Madrassa.
Peralassery Markaz Yatheem Khana
Chirathukandi Azhikkodan club
AKG Memorial

Industries 
Raidco Curry Powder Factory - Moonnu Periya

Peralasseri Panchayath Mini Industrial Estate

Transportation
The national highway passes through Kannur town.  Goa and Mumbai can be accessed on the northern side and Cochin and Thiruvananthapuram can be accessed on the southern side.  The road to the east of Iritty connects to Mysore and Bangalore.   The nearest railway station is Kannur on Mangalore-Palakkad line. 
Trains are available to almost all parts of India subject to advance booking over the internet.  There are airports at Mattanur, Mangalore and Calicut. All of them are international airports but direct flights are available only to Middle Eastern countries.

Notable Persons 

 A K Gopalan - Politician, Social Reformer
 C.H Kunjappa - Writer
 Sukala Suresh - Artist

References

External links 

Cities and towns in Kannur district
Villages near Kannur airport